Bukki ( Buqqi, "proved") may have been an early High Priest of Israel. Another Bukki is mentioned in Numbers as a leader in the Tribe of Dan.

Bukki is mentioned in the books 1 Chronicles (6:4) and Ezra (7:4) as the son of the High Priest Abishua, a priest fifth in descent in the line of Eleazar. In the Apocrypha (2 Esdras 1:2), his name is listed as Borith and in 1 Esdras 8:2, he is called Boccas. According to Josephus (Antiquities of the Jews 5.10.5; 8.1.3) and other extrabiblical sources, he succeeded his father as High Priest.

He is contemporarily identified with the Samaritan High Priest Bakhi. 2nd Samaritan High Priest and Sashai the 1st Samaritan High Priest was possibly his brother

Etymology
Personal name shortened from Bukkiah, meaning, “Yahweh proved”

Numbers 34:22
". . . and the prince of the tribe of the children of Dan, Bukki the son of Jogli . . ."

Patrilineal Ancestry

References

High Priests of Israel
Samaritan high priests